Epermenia shimekii is a moth of the family Epermeniidae. It is endemic to Honshu, Japan.

The forewings are whitish-ochreous, covered with light brown on the basal area. The hindwings are pale grey.

Etymology
The species is named in honour of Mr. Shinji Shimeki, who collected the holotype.

References

External links

Moths described in 2006
Epermeniidae
Endemic fauna of Japan
Moths of Japan